The 1998 Thalgo Australian Women's Hardcourts was a women's tennis tournament played on outdoor hard courts at the Hope Island Resort Tennis Centre in Hope Island, Queensland in Australia that was part of Tier III of the 1998 WTA Tour. It was the second edition of the tournament and was held from 4 January through 10 January 1998. Fourth-seeded Ai Sugiyama won the singles title and earned $27,000 first-prize money.

Finals

Singles

 Ai Sugiyama defeated  Maria Vento 7–5, 6–0.
 It was Sugiyama's 1st title of the year and the 5th of her career.

Doubles

 Elena Likhovtseva /  'Ai Sugiyama defeated  Sung-Hee Park /  Shi-Ting Wang 1–6, 6–3, 6–4.
 It was Likhovtseva's 1st title of the year and the 3rd of her career. It was Sugiyama's 2nd title of the year and the 6th of her career.

References

External links
 ITF tournament edition details
 Tournaments draws

 
Thalgo Australian Women's Hardcourts
Brisbane International
Thal
Thalgo Australian Women's Hardcourts